Waimea Inlet is a section of Tasman Bay / Te Tai-o-Aorere, in New Zealand's South Island. It is at the southern end of the bay, and separated from it by the partial barriers of Rabbit Island and Bell Island to the west and Monaco Peninsula and the reclaimed land of Nelson Airport to the east. The southern suburbs of Stoke and the town of Richmond lie close to the shore of Waimea Inlet.

Inlets of New Zealand